Whisenton is a surname. Notable people with the surname include:

Joffre T. Whisenton, African-American academic administrator
Larry Whisenton (born 1956), American baseball player